Wiesner is a German surname. Notable people with the surname include:

Arnošt Wiesner (1890–1971), modernist architect, also known as Ernst Wiesner
Bernd Wiesner, skydiver who competed for the SC Dynamo Hoppegarten/ Sportvereinigung (SV) Dynamo
Bertold Wiesner (1901–1972), doctor involved in early developments of urine test for pregnancy and techniques for artificial insemination
David Wiesner (born 1956), American author and illustrator of children's books and publications
Ferdinand Wiesner, Austrian luger who competed in the late 1920s
Günter Wiesner, German judo athlete
Jerome Wiesner (1915–1994), educator, a Science Advisor to U.S. Presidents Eisenhower, Kennedy and Johnson
Judith Wiesner (born 1966), former professional tennis player from Austria
Julius Wiesner (1838–1916), author and professor of botany (standard form Wiesner), Vienna
Karel Wiesner, Czech-Canadian chemist
Ken Wiesner (born 1925), American athlete who competed mainly in the high jump
Ljubo Wiesner (1885–1951), Croatian poet
Paul Wiesner (1855–1930), German sailor who competed in the 1900 Summer Olympics
Stephen Wiesner (1942-2021), research physicist
Tom Wiesner (1939–2002), American politician and businessman
Ulla Wiesner (born 1941), German singer from Munich

See also 
Wiesner building houses the MIT Media Lab, the Center for Bits and Atoms and the List Visual Arts Center
Wiessner

German-language surnames